Rybolovlev (from рыболов meaning fisherman) is a Russian masculine surname, its feminine counterpart is Rybolovleva. It may refer to
Dmitry Rybolovlev (born 1966), Russian Oligarch, businessman, investor, and philanthropist
Ekaterina Rybolovleva (born 1989), Russian businesswoman, equestrian and socialite, daughter of Dmitry

Russian-language surnames